Parameswara may refer to:

 Parameswara (king) (1344–1424), Sultan of Malacca
 Parameshvara (1360–1425), Indian mathematician and astronomer
 Parameshwara (god), a Hindu concept literally meaning the Supreme God
Parameswara (Raja), a Malay Sultan and founder of Malacca Sultanate that comes from Palembang, Sumatera